The Dutch Challenge Open was a golf tournament on the Challenge Tour. It was played annually in the Netherlands from 1992 to 2003, except for 1993, 1998 and 1999.

Winners

References

External links
Coverage on the Challenge Tour's official site

Former Challenge Tour events
Golf tournaments in the Netherlands
Recurring sporting events established in 1992
Recurring sporting events disestablished in 2003